Amos Doolittle (May 18, 1754 – January 30, 1832) was an American engraver and silversmith, known as "The Revere of Connecticut." His engravings included portraits and maps, made in his New Haven, Connecticut studio. He became famous for his four engravings depicting the Battles of Lexington and Concord, which were based on his first-hand reconnaissance of the battlefield.

Life and work
Born in Cheshire, Connecticut on May 18, 1754, Doolittle became skilled in copper engraving through self-teaching and apprenticeship. His first published experiment with the medium began when he enlisted in the New Haven company of the Governor's Guards in 1775. Under the leadership of Captain Benedict Arnold, the company arrived in Cambridge, Massachusetts ten days after the Battles of Lexington and Concord at the start of the Revolutionary War. Upon arriving in Cambridge, Doolittle took leave to inspect the site of the battle accompanied by Ralph Earl. Doolittle interviewed colonial militants and residents to establish the scene while Earl surveyed the site and made drawings. From these drawings, Doolittle made at least four engraved copper prints of the battle, which were advertised for sale in the December 1775 Connecticut Journal.

The success of these prints marked the beginning of Doolittle's artistic career. He was sought out by many early Americans eager to learn the art of engraving, including James Wilson. Doolittle established a shop in New Haven, Connecticut, on the present-day site of Yale University's Old Campus, from where he created portraits, maps, and bookplates. Doolittle died on January 30, 1832, and is buried in the Grove Street Cemetery in New Haven. His younger brother Eliakim Doolittle (1772-1850) was a composer and schoolteacher.

Gallery

References

Further reading

External links

American paintings & historical prints from the Middendorf collection, an exhibition catalog from The Metropolitan Museum of Art (fully available online as PDF), which contains material on Doolittle (no. 64, 68)
freepages.genealogy.rootsweb.com

American engravers
American silversmiths
1754 births
1832 deaths
Burials at Grove Street Cemetery
People of colonial Connecticut
People from Cheshire, Connecticut
18th-century engravers
Artists from Connecticut
Doolittle family